Ostrowo Kościelne  is a village in the administrative district of Gmina Strzałkowo, within Słupca County, Greater Poland Voivodeship, in west-central Poland. Population of the village is equal to 174(86 males, 88 females)

References

Villages in Słupca County